Zinc finger protein 334 is a protein that in humans is encoded by the ZNF334 gene.

Function

This gene encodes a member of the C2H2 zinc finger family. The encoded protein contains a Krueppel-associated box, fourteen C2H2 zinc finger domains, and four C2H2-type/integrase DNA-binding domains. Decreased expression of this gene may be a marker for rheumatoid arthritis. Alternative splicing results in multiple transcript variants that encode different protein isoforms.

References

Further reading 

Human proteins